European route E 54 is a road part of the International E-road network. It begins in Paris, France and ends in Munich, Germany.

Route 
 
 Paris → Sens → Troyes (A5) — same route as E60
 Troyes → Langres (A5) — same route as E17
 Langres → Vesoul → Lure → Belfort (N19)
 Belfort → Mulhouse (A36)
  (following the Rhine and the German/Swiss border)
 Lörrach → Rheinfelden → Bad Säckingen → Albbruck → Waldshut-Tiengen → Klettgau (partly (A98))
 
 Schaffhausen
 
 Singen → Überlingen → Friedrichshafen → Lindau (partly A98)
 Lindau → Memmingen → Landsberg am Lech → Munich (A96)

External links 

 UN Economic Commission for Europe: Overall Map of E-road Network (2007)

54
E054
E54
E54